A pneumatic barrier is a method to contain oil spills. It is also called a bubble curtain. Air bubbling through a perforated pipe causes an upward water flow that slows the spread of oil. It can also be used to stop fish from entering polluted water. A further application of the pneumatic barrier is to decrease the salt-water exchange in navigation locks and prevent salt intrusion in rivers.
. 
Pneumatic barriers are also known as air curtains.
The pneumatic barrier is a (non-patented) invention of the Dutch engineer Johan van Veen from around 1940 
.

A pneumatic barrier is an active (as opposed to passive) method of waterway oil spill control.  (An example of a passive method would be a containment boom.)

Method of operation

The pneumatic barrier consists of a perforated pipe and a compressed air source.  Air escaping from the pipe provides a "hump" of rising water and air which contains the oil spill.  Anchors to keep the pipe in a particular spot are helpful. In case of a density current due to salinity differences the barrier mixes the salt water, but also slows down the speed of the density current.

Unique considerations

At water-current speeds exceeding one foot per second, the pneumatic barrier no longer functions effectively, limiting deployable sites.

Environmental issues

The release of compressed air in the water adds oxygen to the local environment.  This may be particularly useful in areas that have become a dead zone due to eutrophication. 

Air curtains may have another application. Dolphin and whale beaching has increased with the rise in ocean temperatures. On Thursday February 12th, 2017, a group of nearly 400 whales beached near Golden Bay on the tip of New Zealand’s South Island, following a similar incident earlier that week. The simplicity of an air curtain system, requiring only air compressors and perforated hoses, could allow for rapid deployment and create aerated zones of oxygenated seawater during a marine emergency.

Air curtains are also used to control the release of smoke particles into the environment. After a natural disaster, or during brush clearing activities, debris is disposed of by incineration in either a ceramic or earth pit containment. Similar to an air curtain to separate indoor air from outdoor air, for instance in restaurants and walk-in refrigerators, a powerful air curtain can defeat the chimney effect of the incineration process to eliminate any smoke from a brush incinerator. The air curtain acts as a lid on the process, and forces the smoke back into the fuel bed for a cleaner burn.

Disadvantages
Like all active systems of any type, a mechanical failure can result in total failure of protection.

External links

Development of an air bubble curtain to reduce underwater noise of percussive piling  Marine Environmental Research 49(2000)79-93, Elsevier  Retrieved 2/16/2017  

Bubble Curtains: Can They Dampen Offshore Energy Sound for Whales?  National Geographic  Retrieved 2/16/2017

You Tube: How an Air Curtain Works  by Berner International  Retrieved 2/16/2017

Fluid dynamics
Pollution